Dávid Ďuriš (born 22 March 1999) is a Slovak professional footballer who currently plays for Fortuna Liga club MŠK Žilina as a forward.

Club career

MŠK Žilina
Ďuriš made his Fortuna Liga debut for Žilina against Zemplín Michalovce on 20 July 2019.

International career
Ďuriš was first called up to Slovak senior national team nomination in premier nomination by Francesco Calzona in September 2022 for 2022–23 UEFA Nations League fixtures, repeating the recognition in same position ahead of November friendlies. He made a debut for the national team on 22 September 2022 at Štadión Antona Malatinského, coming on as a substitute in 83rd minute of the match against Azerbaijan. Ďuriš replaced Matúš Bero with Slovaks trailing 0–1 and lost 1–2 after two further goals by Erik Jirka and Hojjat Haghverdi.

References

External links
 MŠK Žilina official club profile
 
 Futbalnet profile
 

1999 births
Living people
Sportspeople from Žilina
Slovak footballers
Slovakia under-21 international footballers
Association football forwards
MŠK Žilina players
Slovak Super Liga players